Sacred Heart Catholic Secondary (formerly Sacred Heart Roman Catholic VA School) is a Roman Catholic secondary school located in Redcar, North Yorkshire, England.

History
The school was first built in the 1960s but moved to new premises in 2007. The school also became a specialist Science College.

previously a voluntary aided school administered by Redcar and Cleveland Council and the Roman Catholic Diocese of Middlesbrough, Sacred Heart Roman Catholic VA School converted to academy status in September 2015. The school is now part of the Nicholas Postgate Academy Trust, along with a number of other Catholic primary schools locally that are within the Diocese of Middlesbrough.

Reputation
The school is successful in comparison to the other schools in the area. KS4 results have been in the top 5% of schools nationally in both 2008 and 2009. 87% of its pupils achieved five or more GCSE (or equivalent) grades at A*-C in 2009. The progress made by its pupils as measured by its CVA scores has been huge: in 2008 this was 1034 and in 2009 it was 1037. In September 2008 OFSTED reported that this was a good school with many outstanding features.

External links
  Official website

Educational institutions established in 1963
Secondary schools in Redcar and Cleveland
Catholic secondary schools in the Diocese of Middlesbrough
1963 establishments in England
Academies in Redcar and Cleveland
Redcar